The 1995 Japanese Touring Car Championship season was the 11th edition of the series. It began at Fuji Speedway on 12 March and finished after eight events, also at Fuji Speedway on 5 November. The championship was won by Steve Soper, driving for BMW Team Schnitzer. It was his only touring car title and it would be the only time a non-Japanese driver won the series.

Teams & Drivers

Calendar

Championship Standings
Points were awarded 15, 12, 9, 7, 6, 5, 4, 3, 2, 1 to the top 10 finishers in each race, with no bonus points for pole positions or fastest laps. Drivers counted their 11 best scores.

References

Touring Car Championship
Japanese Touring Car Championship seasons